List of the National Register of Historic Places listings in Morris County, New Jersey


This is intended to be a complete list of properties and districts listed on the National Register of Historic Places in Morris County, New Jersey. The locations of National Register properties and districts (at least for all showing latitude and longitude coordinates below) may be seen in an online map by clicking on "Map of all coordinates".

|}

References

Morris